Hanna Klein (born 6 April 1993) is a German middle- and long-distance runner. She won the gold medal in the 3000 metres at the 2023 European Indoor Championships and bronze for the 1500 metres at the 2021 European Indoor Championships. Klein finished fifth in the 1500 m at the 2022 European Championships. She took gold for the 5000 metres at the 2017 Universiade.

Klein won several German national titles outdoors and indoors (1500 m, 5000 m, 3000 m).

Career
Klein finished 11th in both the 1500 metres at the 2017 World Athletics Championships held in London and the 3000 metres at the 2022 World Indoor Championships in Belgrade, Serbia, her highest position at global championships.

After her bronze medal for the 1500 m at the 2021 European Indoor Championships in Toruń, Poland, she secured her first major title with gold for the 3000 m at the 2023 edition in Istanbul. It was the first time in her senior career (since 2015) that she outsprinted compatriot Konstanze Klosterhalfen who earned silver. Klein was beaten by Klosterhalfen to gold at the German Indoor Championships the previous month and their win-loss record stood at 0–10 before.

Achievements
All information from World Athletics profile unless otherwise noted.

International competitions

Personal bests
 800 metres – 2:01.70 (Gillingham 2022)
 1500 metres – 4:02.58 (Nice 2021)
 1500 metres indoor – 4:06.23 (Liévin 2023)
 Mile – 4:23.52 (Zagreb 2022)
 3000 metres – 8:45.00 (Doha 2019)
 3000 metres indoor – 8:35.87 (Istanbul 2023)
 5000 metres – 14:51.71 (Birmingham 2022)
Road
 10 kilometres – 31:40 (Uelzen 2021)

National titles
 German Athletics Championships
 1500 metres: 2020, 2021, 2022
 5000 metres: 2018
 German Indoor Athletics Championships
 1500 metres: 2019, 2020
 3000 metres: 2020, 2021, 2022
 German 10km Road Running Championships
 10 kilometres: 2021

References

External links

 

1993 births
Living people
German female middle-distance runners
German female long-distance runners
Athletes (track and field) at the 2010 Summer Youth Olympics
Universiade medalists in athletics (track and field)
Universiade gold medalists for Germany
Medalists at the 2017 Summer Universiade
World Athletics Championships athletes for Germany
German national athletics champions
People from Landau
Athletes (track and field) at the 2020 Summer Olympics
Olympic athletes of Germany
Sportspeople from Rhineland-Palatinate
21st-century German women